Autonom may refer to:
Autonomism, a set of anti-authoritarian left-wing political and social movements
Autonom, early Russian Orthodox Church name of the male first name Avtonom